Sighthill/Gorgie is one of the seventeen wards used to elect members of the City of Edinburgh Council, established in 2007 along with the other wards. It elects four Councillors (a minor boundary change in 2017 caused the loss of the Calders neighbourhood and the northern parts of Wester Hailes, with a small decrease in population but no change to the number of councillors). In 2019, the ward had a population of 33,826.

Councillors

Election Results

2022 Election
2022 City of Edinburgh Council election

2017 Election
2017 City of Edinburgh Council election

On 4 July 2018, Conservative councillor Ashley Graczyk resigned from the party and became an Independent, saying the UK government's policies on disability issues and social justice were "incompatible with my beliefs and conscience".

2012 Election
2012 City of Edinburgh Council election

2007 Election
2007 City of Edinburgh Council election

References

External links
Listed Buildings in Sighthill/Gorgie Ward, City of Edinburgh at British Listed Buildings

Wards of Edinburgh
Gorgie